The 2019 FIBA 3x3 Africa Cup was the third edition of the African 3x3 basketball event which was held between 8 and 10 November 2019 in Kampala, Uganda. The Lugogo Hockey Pitch was the official venue of the competition.

Participating teams

Men's

Women's

Men's tournament

Pool stage

Pool A

Pool B

Pool C

Pool D

Knockout stage 
All times are local.

Final standings

Women's tournament

Qualifying draw

Pool stage

Pool A

Pool B

Knockout stage 
All times are local.

Final standings

References

External links
 Official website

2019 in 3x3 basketball
November 2019 sports events in Africa